Queen's County was a constituency represented in the Irish House of Commons until 1800. The county was known as County Laois from 1922.

Members of Parliament
 1585 Warham St Leger and Robert Harpole
 1613–1615 Sir Robert Pigott and Sir Henry Power
 1634–1635 John Pigott and Sir Piers Crosby
 1639–1649 John Pigott (died and replaced in 1646 by Francis Barrington) and Sir Charles Coote, 1st Baronet (Coote died and replaced 1642 by George Graham. Graham died and replaced 1642 by Terence McGrath. Mcgrath died and replaced 1646 by Gilbert Rawson)
 1661–1666 Thomas Pigott and Childley Coote (Coote died and replaced 1661 by Daniel Hutchinson)

1689–1801

Notes

References

Historic constituencies in County Laois
Constituencies of the Parliament of Ireland (pre-1801)
1800 disestablishments in Ireland
Constituencies disestablished in 1800